The Korean Empire, officially the Empire of Korea or Imperial Korea, was a Korean monarchical state proclaimed in October 1897 by King Gojong of the Joseon dynasty. The empire stood until Japan's annexation of Korea in August 1910.

During the Korean Empire, Emperor Gojong oversaw the Gwangmu Reform, a partial modernization and westernization of Korea's military, economy, land system, education system, and of various industries. In 1905, the Korean Empire became a protectorate of the Empire of Japan. After the Japanese annexation in 1910, the Korean Empire was abolished.

History

Formation 
Following the Japanese victory in the First Sino-Japanese War, Joseon won independence from the Qing dynasty. Proclaiming an empire was seen by many politicians as a good way to maintain independence. At the request of many officials, Gojong of Korea proclaimed the Korean Empire. In 1897, Gojong was crowned in Hwangudan. Gojong named the new empire Daehan and changed the regnal year to Gwangmu, with 1897 being the first year of Gwangmu. The proclamation of the empire led to diplomatic friction with the Qing dynasty but by avoiding imperial titles in diplomatic correspondence, the conflict was resolved. Gojong made the definition of the country in 1898, which gave the whole authority to the emperor.

Reforms

Gwangmu Reform

Rise of civil rights and the Independence Club 
Even though all authority resided with the emperor, popular influence in politics increased from the Joseon era. Many newspapers such as Tongnip Sinmun were established, promoting political awareness. Many organizations were established, including the Independence Club. Moreover, protests were not banned and people protested for reforms in Seoul. The Independence Club tried to bring many reforms to the country to improve civil rights. The club established the Junchuwon, which was a westernized senate of the Korean Empire. In October 1898, the Independence Club made six requests to the emperor:

 Neither officials nor people shall depend upon foreign aid, but shall do their best to strengthen and uphold the imperial power.
 All documents pertaining to foreign loans, the hiring of foreign soldiers, the granting of concessions, etc., in fact every document drawn up between the Korean government and a foreign party or firm, shall be signed and sealed by all the Ministers of State and the President of the Privy Council.
 Important offenders shall be punished only after they have been given a public trial and ample opportunity to defend themselves.
 To his Majesty shall belong the power to appoint Ministers, but in case a majority of the Cabinet disapproves of the Emperor's nominee he shall not be appointed.
 All sources of revenue and methods of raising taxes shall be placed under the control of the Finance Department, no other department, officer or corporation being allowed to interfere therewith; and the annual estimates and balances shall be made public.
 The existing laws and regulations shall be enforced without fear or favour.

The Sugu Party, who were on the opposing faction with the Independence Party, spread false rumors that the club was trying to depose the Emperor and, establish a republic and make Bak Jeongyang President and Yun Chi-ho Vice President. Because of the false rumors, the Independence Club was banned in December 1899 and despite popular protests, it was not reformed. The new cabinet was formed with many conservative politicians who were conservative compared to members of the Independence Club.

1898–1904 

Even though the Independence Club was banned, reforms were not stopped and the Gwangmu Reform continued. Conservative or left of center Politicians such as Min Young-hwan, Han Kyu-seol, Yi Yong-ik, Shim Soon-taek, Yun Ung-nyeol, and Shim Sang-hun led the reforms. Among these ministers, Yun Ung-nyeol. Yi Yong-ik and Shim Sang-hun were hated by the former members of the Independence Club. These officials tried to reform the country conservatively. The new cabinet formed with conservative politicians wanted to strengthen the power of the emperor. This required more taxes from the citizens. As a result, many minor taxes that were abolished by Gabo Reform were revived. These increased taxes enabled the Imperial Government to be rich enough to perform reform.

The new cabinet also emphasized the independence of the country, leading to the enlargement of the Imperial Korean Army. Colonel Dmitry Putyata and some officers were sent from Russia to Korea. However, Putyata had conflicts with Min Young-hwan, who was the former ambassador to Russia. He returned to Russia on 26 November 1897 after assisting in the modernizing of the army. In 1898, 10 more battalions were formed. By sending troops, the empire tried to protect its people. Officials were sent to Jiandao, where many Koreans lived. By establishing an intelligence consisting of 200 men in 1903, stronger guards were accomplished. The new cabinet also wanted to establish a modern navy by buying ships with KIS Yangmu being the first ship to be bought, for only 451,605 won.

The government tried to industrialize the country by sending many students abroad to study industry. Many new technologies were brought in to Korea and many companies were established. Formalizing land ownership records also enabled better land tax collection. These reforms were able to bring changes to the Korean Empire that made the country richer and stronger.

Tax revenue of the Korean Empire during the Gwangmu Reform:

Foreign affairs 
However, the problem of the Korean Empire was its foreign affairs. Despite its official neutrality, the country had many policies that favored Russia. Russian intervention was frequent while many of Korea's natural resources were sent to Russia.

What Russia's real intentions were for Korea at the time is still unknown. According to a dispatch sent from Shanghai, Russia tried to make the Korean Empire a protectorate of the Russian Empire. But Czar Nicholas II did not want to colonize Korea. In 1901, Nicholas told Prince Henry of Prussia, "I do not want to seize Korea but under no circumstances can I allow Japan to become firmly established there. That will be a casus belli."

Taft-Katsura Agreement and the Russo Japanese War 
Before the Russo-Japanese War, Korea tried to show her neutrality to different Western countries. On 27 January 1904, Russia, France, Germany, and the United Kingdom formally commended Korea's declaration of neutrality.

Later that year on August 22, the first treaty between Japan and Korea, known as the First Japan–Korea Convention, was signed. This allowed the creation of a Japanese garrison in Korea, the Japanese Korean Army. The Taft–Katsura Agreement (also known as the Taft–Katsura Memorandum) was issued on July 17, 1905. It was not actually a secret pact or agreement between the United States and Japan, but rather a set of notes regarding discussions on U.S.-Japanese relations between members of the governments of both countries. The Japanese Prime Minister Taro Katsura used the opportunity presented by Secretary of War William Howard Taft's stopover in Tokyo to extract a statement from Taft on the Korean question, in his capacity as a representative of the Roosevelt Administration. Taft expressed in the memorandum that a suzerain relationship with Japan guiding Korea would "contribute to permanent peace in the Far East."

In September 1905, Russia and Japan signed the Treaty of Portsmouth, ending the Russo-Japanese War and firmly establishing Japan's influence in Korea. Secret diplomatic contacts were sent by the Gwangmu Emperor in the fall of 1905 to entities outside of Korea presenting Korea's desperate case to preserve their sovereignty, as normal diplomatic channels were no longer an option, due to the constant surveillance by the Japanese.

Eulsa Treaty 

Until 1905, the Korean Empire was advancing due to reforms. However, things changed after the Eulsa Treaty. By the Taft–Katsura agreement, America and Japan gave mutual consent to the American colonization of Philippines and the Japanese colonization of Korea. Through numerous treaties, Japan isolated Korea. Emperor Gojong was opposed to the Eulsa Treaty, but negotiations proceeded without him. There were eight ministers in the conference room. Prime Minister Han Kyu-seol, Minister of the Army Yi Geun-taek, Minister of the Interior Yi Ji-yong, Minister of Foreign Affairs Park Je-sun, Minister of Agriculture, Commerce, and Industry Gwon Jung-hyeon, Minister of Finance Min Yeong-gi, and Minister of Justice Yi Ha-yeong were the Korean ministers in the conference room. Except for Han Kyu-seol, Min Yeoung-gi, and Yi Ha-yeong, all the ministers agreed with the treaty, which established a Japanese protectorate over Korea. After the treaty was signed, the Waebu, which was the ministry of foreign affairs, was dissolved. All of Korea's foreign affairs were now handled by Tokyo. Many embassies were recalled from Korea due to the treaty. On February 1, 1906, Itō Hirobumi, who led the Japanese treaty negotiations, became the first Japanese Resident-General of Korea.

The Eulsa Treaty was deeply unpopular. Some, such as Min Young-hwan, committed suicide. Many joined the righteous armies and some even tried to unsuccessfully assassinate the five Korean ministers who consented to the treaty.

Emperor Gojong tried to show the unfairness of the Eulsa Treaty to the world. He sent many messages to European monarchs such as Wilhelm II, George V, Nicholas II, etc. He sent Homer Hulbert, an American missionary and journalist, to the United States as an emissary in order to repudiate the treaty. In June 1906, Nicholas II secretly sent Gojong an invitation for the Hague Convention of 1907. He sent emissaries to the Hague in order to repudiate the Eulsa Treaty. However, the emissaries were not accorded recognition. The houses of Ye Wanyong were burned by the people and the Japanese Korean Army intervened to suppress public discontent. Forces of General Hasegawa garrisoned the palace. Some regiments of the Imperial Korean Army were disarmed. The Pyeongyang Jinwidae, which was the elite unit of the Imperial Korean Army, was disarmed. These acts against the terms of the treaty led to the abdication of Gojong, who was succeeded by Sunjong on 19 July 1907.

Japanese protectorate and annexation 
After Sunjong became emperor, the Japan–Korea Treaty of 1907 was signed. Under the treaty, more Japanese were employed in the Korean government and started to intervene in Korean affairs more. Most of the Imperial Korean Army was dissolved. These Japanese interventions fueled the righteous armies, local peasant militias fighting against the Japanese. These righteous armies fought against Japan with little success. From 1909, the Japanese suppressed all of the righteous armies. Many members of the righteous armies fled to Manchuria or the rest of China to join the Independence Army. Under Terauchi Masatake, Japan prepared to annex Korea. By the treaty of August 22, 1910, the Korean Empire was annexed. The annexation was announced on 29 August 1910.

Military

The Imperial Armed Forces (대한제국군) was the military of the Korean Empire.

Composition 
The Imperial Armed Forces were composed of the Imperial Korean Army and the Imperial Korean Navy.

Organization 
Succeeding the former Joseon Army and Navy, the Gwangmu Reform reorganized the military into a modern, Western-style one. Unlike in the Joseon Dynasty, service was voluntary. It had a size of about 30,000, including soldiers and cadets.

Dissolution 
The military disbanded on August 1, 1907, due to the Japan-Korea Treaty of 1907. Major Park Seung-hwan protested by committing suicide, sparking a revolt led by former imperial soldiers leading to the battle at Namdaemun Gate. Emperor Sunjong incorporated the remaining soldiers into the Imperial Guards until 1910, while others formed the foundations of the Righteous armies.

Economy 
Some modern enterprises emerged in the Korean Empire, including some hand-operated machinery. These enterprises faced a crisis when Japanese products were imported into the country and the enterprises lacked capital intensity. Although limited banking infrastructure existed, it was not able to adequately support economic development. Large Korean (South Korean) companies existing to this day such as Doosan and Korea Electric Power Corporation originated during the Imperial period. 

Nonetheless, the Korean Empire was able to have good economic growth. The GDP per capita of the Korean Empire was $850 in 1900, which was 26th highest in the world and 2nd highest in Asia.

The economic progress of the Korean Empire was reflected in a secret report that Hayashi Gonsuke sent to Aoki Shūzō, indicating that the Korean Empire was becoming an economic participant on the global stage.

Tax revenue of the Korean Empire during 1895–1905:

Annual expenditure of the Korean Empire during 1895–1905:

Diplomatic relationships
 : 1876–1910
 : 1882–1905
 : 1883–1905
 : 1883–1905
 : 1884–1905
 : 1884–1905
 : 1886–1905
 : 1892–1905
 : 1899–1905
 : 1901–1905
 : 1902–1905

Gallery

In popular culture
The 2020 South Korean TV series, The King: Eternal Monarch, takes place in an alternate reality where the Korean Empire continues to exist in the modern world.
The 2018 South Korean TV series, Mr. Sunshine, is set in the last days of the Korean Empire.
The 2018 South Korean TV series, The Last Empress, depicts a modern-day Korean Empire in an alternate reality along with a dark secret of the imperial family leading to its demise.

See also

 List of monarchs of Korea
 Korean Imperial Household
 Joseon
 Battle of Namdaemun
 National anthem of the Korean Empire

Footnotes

References

Citations

Sources 

 Dong-no Kim, John B. Duncan, Do-hyung Kim (2006), Reform and Modernity in the Taehan Empire (Yonsei Korean Studies Series No. 2), Seoul: Jimoondang Publishing Company
 Jae-gon Cho, The Industrial Promotion Policy and Commercial Structure of the Taehan Empire. 

 Pratt, Keith L., Richard Rutt, and James Hoare. (1999). Korea: a historical and cultural dictionary, Richmond: Curzon Press. ; ; OCLC 245844259
 The Special Committee for the Virtual Museum of Korean History (2009), Living in Joseon Part 3: The Virtual Museum of Korean History-11, Paju: Sakyejul Publishing Ltd.

External links
 The Great Revival Movement of 1907 And its Historical Impact on Korean Church

 
States and territories established in 1897
States and territories disestablished in 1910
Former empires in Asia
1897 establishments in Korea
1910 disestablishments in Korea
Former protectorates